Jonell is a contemporary R&B singer.

In 2001, Jonell introduced with her first hit Round and Round on producer Hi-Tek's album Hi-Teknology.  Later that year Jonell intended to release her debut album on the Def Soul label. Her first single "So Whassup" featured a guest appearance by Redman. However, the album was never released.  In 2005, her webpage on the Def Soul website was no longer accessible.

Discography

Singles

References

Year of birth missing (living people)
Living people
American women singers
21st-century African-American women singers
American contemporary R&B singers
Musicians from Cincinnati
Singers from Ohio